Anthony Hayes may refer to:

 Anthony Hayes (actor) (born 1977), Australian actor
 Stevie Plunder (1963–1996), born Anthony Hayes, Australian guitarist, singer and songwriter